Good Grief is an upcoming romantic comedy film written and directed by and starring Dan Levy.

Premise
A man struggling to cope with the deaths of his husband and mother travels with his two best friends to Paris for a weekend getaway.

Cast
 Dan Levy
 Ruth Negga
 Himesh Patel
 Luke Evans
 Celia Imrie
 Arnaud Valois
 David Bradley
 Jamael Westman

Production
In September 2021, Dan Levy was announced to be writing and directing a romantic comedy film for Netflix, in which he would also star as part of a film and television deal he signed with the company. Levy described the film in a June 2022 interview as being more a "love story about friendship". In October 2022, additional casting including Ruth Negga, Himesh Patel and Luke Evans was announced.

Filming had begun by November 2022 in London.

References

External links
 

American romantic comedy films
English-language Netflix original films
Films shot in London
Films shot in Paris
Upcoming directorial debut films
Upcoming Netflix original films